PT Semen Indonesia (Persero) Tbk, commonly known as SIG, is an Indonesian cement company established in 1957 in Gresik, with the name NV Semen Gresik. In 1991, PT Semen Gresik was the first state-owned company to go public on the Indonesia Stock Exchange. Furthermore, in 1995, PT Semen Gresik (Persero) Tbk consolidated with PT Semen Padang and PT Semen Tonasa which became known as Semen Gresik Group.

On January 7, 2013, PT Semen Gresik (Persero) Tbk transformed into PT Semen Indonesia (Persero) Tbk, and acted as a strategic holding company that oversees Semen Gresik, Semen Padang, Semen Tonasa, and Thang Long Cement.

On January 31, 2019, SIG through its subsidiary PT Semen Indonesia Industri Bangunan (SIIB) has officially acquired 80.6% ownership of Holderfin B.V. placed and paid for at Holcim Indonesia. Furthermore, on February 11, 2019, through the mechanism of the Extraordinary General Meeting of Shareholders, the change of name of PT Holcim Indonesia Tbk has been approved to become PT Solusi Bangun Indonesia Tbk.

References

External links
 

1957 establishments in Indonesia
1991 initial public offerings
Companies based in Gresik
Companies based in Jakarta
Companies listed on the Indonesia Stock Exchange
 
Cement companies of Indonesia
Government-owned companies of Indonesia
Indonesian brands
Manufacturing companies established in 1957
Indonesian companies established in 1957